Gayle Callen (born Gayle Ann Kloecker) is an American author of more than 40 romance novels. She writes as Emma Cane for her contemporary novels. She has written as Julia Latham for her medieval historical series and as Gwen Rowley for an Arthurian novel.

Biography and awards
A USA Today bestselling author, Gayle Callen has written historical and contemporary romances for Avon Books.

Named the "Notable New Author of 1999," Gayle has also won the Holt Medallion, the Laurel Wreath Award, the Booksellers' Best Award, the National Readers Choice Award and was a nominee for the RT Book Reviews Magazine's Reviewers' Choice Award. Her books have been translated into eleven different languages. She also writes  contemporary romance as Emma Cane.

She resides in a suburb of Central New York with her husband. Now that her three children are grown, she has time to read, sing, travel, crochet, and delve too deeply into historical research. A past President of the Central New York Romance Writers, she is also a member of Romance Writers of America and Novelists Inc.

Bibliography

Books written as Gayle Callen  

 The Groom Wore Plaid (2016 Avon Books )
 The Wrong Bride (2015, Avon Books )
 Redemption of the Duke (2014, Avon Books )
 Surrender to the Earl (2013, Avon Books )
 Return of the Viscount (2012, Avon Books )
 Every Scandalous Secret (2011, Avon Books )
 A Most Scandalous Engagement (2010, Avon Books )
 In Pursuit of a Scandalous Lady (2010, Avon Books )
 Never Marry a Stranger (2009, Avon Books )
 Never Dare a Duke (2008, Avon Books )
 Never Trust a Scoundrel (2008, Avon Books )
 The Viscount in Her Bedroom (2007, Avon Books )
 The Duke in Disguise (2006, Avon Books )
 The Lord Next Door (2005, Avon Books )
 A Woman's Innocence. (2005, Avon Books )
 The Beauty and the Spy (2004, Avon Books )
 No Ordinary Groom (2004, Avon Books )
 His Bride (2002, Avon Books )
 His Scandal (2002, Avon Books )
 Hot and Bothered (Anthology) (2001, St. Martin's Press )
 His Betrothed (2001, Avon Books )
 My Lady's Guardian (2000, Avon Books )
 A Knight's Vow (1999, Avon Books )
 The Darkest Knight (1999, Avon Books )

Books written as Emma Cane  

 Ever After at Sweetheart Ranch     (2015, Avon Books.  )
 Sleigh Bells in Valentine Valley     (2014, Avon Books.  )
 When the Rancher Came to Town     (A Novella) (2014, Avon Impulse.  )
 A Promise at Bluebell Hill     (2014, Avon Books.  )
 The Cowboy of Valentine Valley     (2014, Avon Books.  )
 All I Want for Christmas Is a Cowboy,     An Anthology with "A Christmas Cabin" Novella (Avon Impulse.      )
 A Wedding in Valentine     (A Novella) (2013, Avon Impulse.  )
 True Love at Silver Creek Ranch     (2013, Avon Books.  )
 A Town Called Valentine     (2012, Avon Books.  )

Books written as Julia Latham 
Sin and Surrender (2011, Avon Books. )
Wicked, Sinful Nights (2010, Avon Books. )
Taken and Seduced (2009, Avon Books. )
Secrets of the Knight (2008, Avon Books. )
One Knight Only (2007, Avon Books. )
Thrill of the Knight (2007, Avon Books. )

Books written as Gwen Rowley
Knights of the Round Table: Geraint (2007, Jove Books )

References

External links

Living people
American romantic fiction novelists
American historical novelists
21st-century American novelists
Year of birth missing (living people)